Andrew Warner may refer to:

 Scoot Andrews (born 1971), American professional wrestler
 Andrew Jackson Warner (1833–1910), architect in Rochester, New York
 Andrew S. Warner (1819–1887), American politician from New York